Leimert Bridge is located in the Oakmore neighborhood of Oakland, California. It is a cement and steel arch bridge. When it was built in 1926, it was the largest single-span bridge on the West Coast.

The bridge was designed by George Posey who also designed the Posey Tube tunnel between Oakland and Alameda.

Realtor Walter H. Leimert built the bridge in order to develop the Oakmore Heights area. The Park Boulevard #18 street car line spurred off the Key System and crossed the bridge connecting Oakmore to central Oakland until the late 1940s; the streetcar power lines were then converted to street lighting.

It became a City of Oakland landmark in 1980.

The multi-use trails of Dimond Canyon travel under the bridge and can be accessed from the Dimond Canyon Trail off El Centro Ave, or Old Cañon Trail off Benevides Ave.

References
Mailman. Erika. Oakland Hills (Images of America). Arcadia Publishing. 2004.

External links
 The Leimert Bridge: Historical background - Oakmore Homes Association with pictures of bridge

Bridges in Alameda County, California
Buildings and structures in Oakland, California
Road bridges in California
Bridges completed in 1926
1926 establishments in California
Arch bridges in the United States
Steel bridges in the United States
Concrete bridges in California